Best of the Blessed is a greatest hits album by German power metal band Powerwolf. Initially set to be released on 5 June 2020, it was later released on 3 July 2020 via Napalm Records. The album is partly a collection of songs released since 2013, while also containing six re-recorded songs and one re-written song released prior to 2013.

A limited earbook and LP box edition also features a second disc named The Live Sacrament, which will feature live songs recorded during Wolfsnächte Tour 2018.

Before the album was released, the group released the song "Kiss of the Cobra King" as a single on 1 November 2019. The song received a music video. On 27 March 2020, they released the single "Werewolves of Armenia".

Track listing

Credits and personnel 
 Attila Dorn – vocals
 Matthew Greywolf – lead guitar
 Charles Greywolf – rhythm guitar, bass
 Falk Maria Schlegel – organ, keyboards
 Stéfane Funèbre – drums
 Roel van Helden – drums

Charts

References 

2020 greatest hits albums
Albums produced by Fredrik Nordström
Albums produced by Jens Bogren
Napalm Records albums
Powerwolf albums
Powerwolf live albums